Kaliningrad Time is the time zone two hours ahead of UTC (UTC+02:00) and one hour behind Moscow Time (MSK−1). It is used in Kaliningrad Oblast.

Until 2011, Kaliningrad Time was identical to Eastern European Time (UTC+02:00; UTC+03:00 with daylight saving time). On 27 March 2011, Russia moved to permanent DST, switching Kaliningrad time permanently to UTC+03:00. On 26 October 2014, this law was reversed but daylight saving time was not reintroduced, so Kaliningrad is now permanently set to UTC+02:00.

Main cities:
 Kaliningrad
 Sovetsk
 Chernyakhovsk

See also 
 Time in Russia

References 

Time zones
Time in Russia